Blackeyes is a multi-layered novel by British writer Dennis Potter, published in 1987 by Faber and Faber. It concerns the relationship between sexuality, exploitation, power and money. These are explored through the career of a desirable model known as "Blackeyes".

The novel was later adapted by Potter as a 1989 BBC television serial of the same name with actress Gina Bellman in the eponymous role.

1987 British novels
Novels by Dennis Potter
Faber and Faber books